Franchón Crews-Dezurn (born June 13, 1987) is an American professional boxer. She is the current undisputed super middleweight world champion, after winning the WBA and IBF female super middleweight titles from Elin Cederroos on April 30, 2022 and having held the WBO female title since March 2020 and previously from 2019 to January 2020; and the WBC female title since June 2020 and previously from 2018 to January 2020. As of May 2022, she is ranked as the world's best active female super middleweight by The Ring and BoxRec.

Professional career
Born in Virginia Beach, Virginia, after a successful amateur career where she represented United States internationally, Crews-Dezurn debuted professionally on November 19, 2016, against two-time Olympic champion Claressa Shields, losing by unanimous decision.

Crews-Dezurn won her first professional world title in September 2018, beating Maricela Cornejo for the vacant WBC super middleweight title, in a bout held at the Hard Rock Hotel and Casino in Las Vegas.

On September 14, 2019, in a rematch against Cornejo, Crews-Dezurn retained the WBC super middleweight title and won the WBO title, defeating her rival in ten rounds by unanimous decision.

Crews-Dezurn was signed by Golden Boy Promotions in June 2019.

On January 11, 2020, Crews-Dezurn fought Alejandra Jimenez. After 10 rounds, Jimenez was declared the winner, by split decision. However, on February 10, 2020, the result of the fight was changed to a "no decision," due to Jimenez having failed a pre-fight PED test. In March 2020, the WBO stripped Jimenez of their belt, and then, In June 2020, the WBC did the same.

Professional boxing record

References

External links

Living people
1987 births
Super-middleweight boxers
American women boxers
World Boxing Council champions
World Boxing Organization champions
Boxers from Virginia
Sportspeople from Virginia Beach, Virginia
Boxers at the 2011 Pan American Games
African-American boxers
Pan American Games competitors for the United States
21st-century African-American sportspeople
20th-century African-American people
20th-century African-American women
21st-century African-American women